Rebecca Hensler founded the social media and internet support group "Grief Beyond Belief" for grieving people who do not believe in God or an afterlife in 2011. She was encouraged to found it by atheist activist Greta Christina. Hensler's own son Nathaniel Judah Hensler, also called Jude, died in 2009 after ninety days of life due to a congenital diaphragmatic hernia. Hensler also published a book called The Secular Grief Support Handbook.

Aside from her atheist activism, she helped found ACT UP San Francisco, but left when new leaders that discouraged HIV testing and medications took over.

Hensler has a BA in political activism and a MS in counseling. She works as a school counselor at a public middle school in San Francisco, and lives in the Bay Area with her wife.

Hensler has multiple sclerosis.

She is openly bisexual.

References

External links
 Grief Beyond Belief website

American atheism activists
Bisexual women
American bisexual writers
HIV/AIDS activists
LGBT people from California
Living people
People with multiple sclerosis
Year of birth missing (living people)
21st-century atheists